The Vorarlberg state election of 2024 will be held in the Austrian state of Vorarlberg in the autumn of 2024.

Background 
In the 2019 state election, the ÖVP was the strongest party with 43.5% of the vote, but fell short of the absolute mandate majority. With 18.9%, the Greens achieved their best election result to date in a Vorarlberg state election and became the second strongest party for the first time. The FPÖ was the only party to suffer losses and became the third strongest party with 13.9%. The SPÖ was able to recover minimally, reaching 9.5% while NEOS obtained 8.5% of the vote. The small parties "Home to all Cultures" (HAK) and "Xi – Future Opportunity" were able to obtain results above 1%, but ultimately failed to reach the 5% threshold to enter parliament.

The ÖVP decided to continue the previous coalition with the Greens after negotiations that lasted less than two weeks. In the constituent session of the Landtag on 13 October 2019, the state government under Governor Markus Wallner (ÖVP) was sworn in.

Opinion polling

References 

State elections in Austria